The third Solheim Cup match took place from October 21 to October 23, 1994, at The Greenbrier, White Sulphur Springs, West Virginia, United States. The United States team regained the cup from the European team winning by 13 points to 7.

Teams

Europe
 Mickey Walker (Captain) – England
 Helen Alfredsson – Gothenburg, Sweden
 Laura Davies – Coventry, England
 Lora Fairclough – Chorley, England
 Trish Johnson – Bristol, England
 Liselotte Neumann – Finspang, Sweden
 Alison Nicholas – Gibraltar
 Catrin Nilsmark – Gothenburg, Sweden
 Dale Reid – Ladybank, Scotland
 Annika Sörenstam – Stockholm, Sweden
 Pam Wright – Torphins, Scotland

JoAnne Carner (Captain) – Kirkland, Washington
Donna Andrews – Lynchburg, Virginia
Brandie Burton – San Bernardino, California
Beth Daniel – Charleston, South Carolina
Tammie Green – Somerset, Ohio
Betsy King – Reading, Pennsylvania
Meg Mallon – Natick, Massachusetts
Dottie Mochrie – Saratoga Springs, New York
Kelly Robbins – Mt. Pleasant, Michigan
Patty Sheehan – Middlebury, Vermont
Sherri Steinhauer – Madison, Wisconsin

Format
A total of 20 points were available. Day 1 was five rounds of foursomes. Day 2 was five rounds of fourballs. The final 10 points were decided in a round of singles matchplay. All ten golfers from each team played on each day.

Day one foursomes
Friday, October 21, 1994

Day two fourball
Saturday, October 22, 1994

Day three singles
Sunday, October 23, 1994

External links
1994 Solheim Cup Match Results

Solheim Cup
Golf in West Virginia
Sports competitions in West Virginia
The Greenbrier
Solheim Cup
Solheim Cup
Solheim Cup
Solheim Cup
Women's sports in West Virginia